The 2014 Caribbean Cup was the 18th edition of the Caribbean Cup, an international football competition for national teams of member nations affiliated with the Caribbean Football Union (CFU) of the CONCACAF region.

The final competition stage (8 teams) was scheduled for 11–18 November. On 18 March 2014, it was announced that Jamaica would host the final stage.

For the first time, the competition and its qualifying stages were scheduled to take place during officially sanctioned FIFA international match periods. The change was made to assist the national Football Associations selecting high profile Caribbean players whose clubs would be otherwise reluctant to lose the players service while on international duty. Previous editions of the competition have taken place on non-FIFA calendar dates. Horace Burrell, the Jamaican Football Federation President stated that the change would "ensure the tournament has star power".

The top four teams would qualify for the 2015 CONCACAF Gold Cup automatically while the fifth place team would advance to a play-off against the fifth place team from the 2014 Copa Centroamericana tournament. This is the first time that the two overall fifth-placed teams compete to qualify for the CONCACAF Gold Cup, previously five teams from Central America and four from the Caribbean have qualified for the Confederation's competition.

The winner of the tournament would qualify for the Copa América Centenario, a 16-team tournament of CONMEBOL and CONCACAF national teams to be held in the United States in 2016.

Qualification

A preliminary qualification round was scheduled for May 2014. The first round of qualification (24 teams) was scheduled for 1–9 September and the second round of qualification (16 teams) was scheduled for 6–14 October.

In April 2014, the Caribbean Football Union announced the group stage draw. A total of 26 teams entered the competition. Cuba (defending champion) and Jamaica (host) received byes to the final round. Bahamas, Bermuda, Cayman Islands, Saint Martin, and Sint Maarten did not enter.

Qualified teams
The following eight teams qualified for the final stage of the tournament.

Bold indicates that the corresponding team was hosting or co-hosting the event.
1. French Guiana and Martinique are not FIFA members, and so do not have a FIFA Ranking.
2. This is Curaçao's first appearance since the dissolution of the Netherlands Antilles, as its direct successor (with regards to membership in football associations), inheriting the former nation's FIFA membership and competitive record.

Venue

In March 2013, it was announced that the final stage of the tournament would be held in Montego Bay.

Squads

Group stage
All times are local (UTC−05:00).

On 24 October, the Caribbean Football Union announced that fixtures had been arranged, Group A games would be played a day earlier than previously reported, Group B games would be played a day later. Following the request of several participating teams, the CFU decided to delay the tournament by one day, changing the dates from 10–17 November to 11–18 November.

Group A

Group B

Ranking of third place teams
As there was no fifth place match, French Guiana, the best group third-placed team according to group stage results, advanced to represent the Caribbean Football Union at the 2015 CONCACAF Gold Cup qualification play-off, where they will play against Honduras, the 2014 Copa Centroamericana fifth-placed team. The winner of the play-off will qualify for the 2015 CONCACAF Gold Cup.

Final stage

Third place match

Final

Jamaica qualified for the Copa América Centenario.

Goalscorers
3 goals

 Kervens Belfort
 Darren Mattocks
 Kevin Molino

2 goals

 Ariel Martínez
 Rihairo Meulens
 Gilles Fabien
 Brian Saint-Clair
 Kenwyne Jones
 Wilde-Donald Guerrier

1 goal

 Peter Byers
 Myles Weston
 Jorge Luis Corrales
 Orisbel Leiva
 Yasmany López
 Gianluca Maria
 Gevaro Nepomuceno
 Prince Rajcomar
 Neki Adipi
 Jean-David Legrand
 Mickaël Solvi
 Jean Sony Alcénat
 Mechack Jérôme
 Rodolph Austin
 Simon Dawkins
 Kemar Lawrence
 Yoann Arquin
 Bedi Buval
 José-Thierry Goron
 Ataullah Guerra
 Lester Peltier

Awards
The following awards were given at the conclusion of the tournament:

References

External links
Caribbean Cup, CFUfootball.org
Final round results

 
2014
2014–15 in Jamaican football
International association football competitions hosted by Jamaica
2014–15 in Caribbean football